NBA Saturday Primetime on ABC is the name for National Basketball Association (NBA) games produced by ESPN and televised on its sister network the American Broadcasting Company (ABC). As these games air in primetime, they are considered the showcase games for ABC's NBA coverage.

ABC has been the NBA's broadcast TV partner since 2002, and games have mostly aired on Sunday afternoons.  In 2006, ABC Sports was absorbed by ESPN, and all sports telecasts on ABC since then air under the ESPN on ABC banner.

The Saturday primetime games – usually featuring marquee matchups of the league's most prominent teams – began in the 2015-2016 season.

Saturday primetime games begin airing on ABC in December or January, following the completion of college football season which features the network's Saturday Night Football telecasts.

Games and results

2022–2023

2021–2022

2021

2020

2019

2018

2017

2016

References

2016 American television series debuts
ABC Sports
American Broadcasting Company original programming
ABC